Bob Heaney (born December 5, 1945) is a Canadian former professional ice hockey defenceman. He was selected by the Calgary Broncos in the late rounds of the 1972 WHA General Player Draft.

Career statistics

References
 

1945 births
Living people
Amarillo Wranglers players
Calgary Broncos draft picks
Canadian expatriate ice hockey players in the United States
Canadian ice hockey defencemen
Dayton Gems players
Hershey Bears players
Kansas City Blues players
Minneapolis Bruins players
Oklahoma City Blazers (1965–1977) players
Salt Lake Golden Eagles (WHL) players